"Fascination Street" is a 1989 North-American-only single by the English rock band The Cure from their album Disintegration.

Their American record company refused the band's original choice "Lullaby" as the first single (it was the lead single in the UK and was released in the U.S. later) and used "Fascination Street" instead. The song is notable for its extended bass introduction.

The song became the band's first number-one single on Billboard's then-newly created Modern Rock Tracks chart, where it stayed on top for seven weeks.

An extended mix was also produced for their 1990 remix record Mixed Up, notable for a 4:00 instrumental intro before lyrics begin.

Background
"Fascination Street" was inspired by an alcoholic night in New Orleans.

Track listing

7": Elektra / 7 69300 (US) 
 "Fascination Street" [Remix] (4:17)
 "Babble" (4:16)

 also available on cassette 9 469300

12": Elektra / 96 67040 (CDN)
 "Fascination Street" [Extended Remix] (8:48)
 "Babble" (4:16)
 "Out of Mind" (3:51)

12": Elektra / 0-66704 (US)
 "Fascination Street" [Extended Remix] (8:48)
 "Babble" (4:16)
 "Out of Mind" (3:51)

CD: Elektra / 66702-2 (US)
 "Fascination Street" [Remix] (4:17)
 "Babble" (4:16)
 "Out of Mind" (3:51)
 "Fascination Street" [Extended Remix] (8:48)

Personnel

Band 

Simon Gallup – bass guitar
Robert Smith – lead guitar, keyboards, vocals, producer, engineer
Porl Thompson – guitar
Boris Williams – drums
Roger O'Donnell – keyboards
Lol Tolhurst – other instruments

Production 

Mark Saunders – remix
Robert Smith – remix, producer, engineer
Chris Parry – remix
David M. Allen – producer, engineer

Charts

See also
List of Billboard number-one alternative singles of the 1980s

References

1989 singles
The Cure songs
Songs written by Robert Smith (musician)
1988 songs
Elektra Records singles
Songs written by Simon Gallup
Songs written by Porl Thompson
Songs written by Boris Williams
Songs written by Roger O'Donnell
Songs written by Lol Tolhurst
Song recordings produced by David M. Allen